Georgy Stepanovich Vasilchenko (1921–2006) was a Russian neuropathologist and the pioneer of sexology in the USSR.  He was the first to write Soviet handbooks on sexopathology (1977 and 1983).

Selected publications 
 Общая сексопатология: Руководство для врачей (General Sexopathology: Management Manual) / под ред. Г. С. Васильченко. М.: Медицина, 1977. (several editions)

 For an English translation, see: 
 Г. С. Васильченко, И. С. Кон. Половая жизнь // Большая советская энциклопедия. — М.: Советская энциклопедия 1969—1978
 For an English translation, see: 

 For an English translation, see:

References 

Russian sexologists
Soviet neurologists
Russian neurologists
1921 births
2006 deaths
Soviet sexologists